Jean Nicot de Villemain (1530 – May 4, 1604) was a French diplomat and scholar. He is famous for being the first to bring tobacco to France, including snuff tobacco. Nicotine is named after the tobacco plant Nicotiana tabacum, which in turn is named after Jean Nicot de Villemain, who sent tobacco and seeds to Paris in 1560, presented it to the French King, and who promoted their medicinal use. Smoking was believed to protect against illness, particularly the plague.

Early life
Jean Nicot was born in 1530 in Nîmes, in the south of France. His father was a notary. He was educated in Toulouse and Paris.

Career
Nicot served as the French ambassador in Lisbon, Portugal from 1547 to 1559 under Henry II, under king Francis II from 1559 to 1560, and from 1560 to 1574 under Charles IX. As a 29-year-old in 1559, he was sent from France to Portugal to negotiate the marriage of six-year-old princess Margaret of Valois to five-year-old King Sebastian of Portugal.

Introduction of tobacco

When Nicot returned, he brought tobacco plants. He introduced snuff tobacco to the French royal court.<ref name="Britannica In particular, he presented the queen mother, Catherine de' Medici, with tobacco leaves to cure her of her migraines. The plant was also an instant success with the Father Superior of Malta, who shared tobacco with all of his monks. More and more of the fashionable people of Paris began to use the plant, making Nicot a celebrity.

Although André Thevet argued that he had introduced tobacco to France, the plant was called Nicotina. But nicotine later came to refer specifically to the particular chemical in the plant. The tobacco plant, Nicotiana, also a flowering garden plant, was named after him by Carl Linnaeus, as was nicotine. Nicot described its believed medicinal properties (1559) and sent it as a medicine to the French court.

French dictionary

For his service to the French royal court, Nicot was given the name 'de Villemain' and land near Brie-Comte-Robert. There, he compiled one of the first French dictionaries,  (published in 1606). His dictionary, according to Ibram X. Kendi, was the first that included an entry for the concept of race.
The IETF language tags have registered  for "16th century French as in Jean Nicot, 'Thresor de la langue francoyse', 1606, but also including some French similar to that of Rabelais".

Death
He died on May 4, 1604, in Paris, France.

References

External links
Website dedicated to Nicot's Thresor  (in French)
-Search the Thresor online

1530 births
1604 deaths
Tobacco in France
16th-century French diplomats
Ambassadors of France to Portugal
French lexicographers
People from Nîmes
French male non-fiction writers